"Like U Like"  is a song by the British recording artist Aggro Santos featuring the Girls Aloud member Kimberley Walsh. The song was written by Steve Mac, Wayne Hector, and Aggro Santos and produced by Mac for his first album, AggroSantos.com (2011). After Santos mentioned to Gary Barlow that he was interested in making a duet with Walsh, Barlow contacted her and arranged their duet. Originally, Walsh's part was sung by a male. The song uses synthesiser noises while Walsh's voice was described by reviewers as sultry and monotone.

The song received mixed reviews from critics complimenting the synthesiser noises but criticising Walsh's contribution to the song. An accompanying music video, directed by the Lennox Brothers, shows Santos trying to win Walsh's affections during speed dating. It was noted that Walsh looked like her bandmate Cheryl Cole. The single entered at number eight and thirteen on the UK Singles Chart and Irish Singles Chart, respectively.

Background and composition
In an interview with MTV United Kingdom, Santos said that Walsh replaced a male vocalist on the song. "I think it suits a girl's vocal more. It's more of a softer song and Kimberley did a great job on the vocals." He also said that Gary Barlow had arranged the duet. "I was a big fan of Girls Aloud for years and I mentioned that to Gary Barlow who is a friend of Kim's. I said I would be up for working with her. He spoke to her and she was up for it, so we made 'Like U Like'."

"Like U Like" is a rap-electro song which uses "grinding synths", "techno bleeps" and "catchy hand-claps" with Walsh providing a sultry voice. The song was written by Mac, Hector and Santos. Santos said that "Like U Like" "[is] more pop, bubbly and commercial than my last track, 'Saint or Sinner'".

Critical reception
"Like U Like" received mixed reviews from critics. Robert Copsey from Digital Spy wrote, "[Kimberley Walsh's] sultry tones garnishing 'Like U Like's spicy mix of grinding synths, techno bleeps and catchy hand-claps in oh-so tasty fashion." Leanne Rain of Hive Magazine praised the song. "[The] single has all the ingredients of a pop classic, and possesses one of the biggest pop hooks of the year." Other critics criticised Walsh's appearance. Jon O'Brien from AllMusic said, "[the song] won't exactly threaten Cheryl Cole's status as the band's chief success." He also described "Like U Like" as a "tuneless dirge". Rach Read from Teentoday also commented on Walsh's appearance. "Like U Like is a tacky trashtastic 'club banger' that would have completely slipped under our radar [if it] had it not featured Girls Aloud's most shapely member [...] That's in addition to looking extremely lovely, working some super-sexy moves and contributing some not terribly good vocals." Morwenna Ferrier from The Guardian wrote that Santos raps like he has chips stuffed in his cheeks.

Music video

The music video for "Like U Like" was directed by the Lennox Brothers. The video has Santos adopting a variety of different looks to try to win the affections of Walsh during speed dating.

Reception 
Rach Read from Teentoday described the speed dating as the "worst speed-dating session in the world" because "every other participant seems to be Aggro himself. Get your money back, love!" A reviewer from Sugar said that he loved the video particularly commenting on Kimberley's dance moves.

Formats and track listings
Digital download
 "Like U Like" (featuring Kimberley Walsh) - 3:25

Like U Like - EP
 "Like U Like" (featuring Kimberley Walsh) - 3:25
 "Like U Like" (Digital Dog Remix) - 6:09
 "Like U Like" (Instrumental) - 3:10
 Album Preview Mix - 5:23

Charts

Release history

References

2011 singles
Mercury Records singles
Songs written by Steve Mac
Songs written by Wayne Hector
Song recordings produced by Steve Mac
2011 songs